Confession of Murder (lit. "I Am the Murderer") is a 2012 South Korean action thriller film directed by Jung Byung-gil, starring Jung Jae-young and Park Si-hoo. It is about a police officer who is haunted for failing to capture a serial killer 15 years back, and returns to the case after a novelist publishes the book I Am the Murderer, claiming responsibility for the crimes.

The film is Jung's first mainstream feature; he first drew notice for his 2008 documentary film about Korean stunt men, Action Boys. Produced by Dasepo Club co. Ltd, and distributed by Showbox, it was released on November 8, 2012, and ran for 119 minutes.

Plot 
Choi Hyeong-goo is a detective who was in charge of hunting down a serial killer who claimed the lives of 10 women from 1986 to 1990, and whom Choi suspects is responsible for the kidnapping and possible murder of another. He managed to hunt down the killer, but lost him after a fierce fight that left Choi nearly dead and permanently scarred. Before the killer vanished however, Choi managed to shoot him in the shoulder.

The film begins in 2005, on the day the 15-year statute of limitations expired, thus rendering prosecution impossible. Choi is now an alcoholic, haunted by his failure to solve the case. He suddenly receives a worrying call from Jung Hyun-sik a family member of one of the victims. Choi rushes to his apartment, only to see Jung throw himself off a roof and land through the windshield of a passing bus. Two years later, Choi is alerted to the news that a man called Lee Doo-seok has released a book titled I Am the Murderer, claiming responsibility for the murders that took place 17 years ago. His book contains detailed descriptions of the murders, and he even displays a wound in his shoulder where he says Choi shot him. His book becomes a bestseller because of the author’s charming looks and his claims of repentance for his crimes. He stages public visits to the homes of family members to beg for forgiveness, and even visits Choi at his precinct. Choi himself however, insists that Lee is in fact an imposter.

As the media frenzy surrounding Lee increases, some family members of the victims gather together to plot their revenge. They are led by Han Ji-soo, whose daughter Kang Soo-yeon was the still-missing 11th victim. Snakes are released into Lee's hotel swimming pool during his daily swim, resulting in him getting bitten. The family members then pose as a paramedic unit sent to take Lee to the hospital. They are discovered and pursued by members of Lee's security unit as well as Choi, but manage to get away with an unconscious Lee after a lengthy and dangerous car chase. Choi recognizes who the kidnappers are, but refuses to reveal his suspicions. Instead he goes out of his way to track down where Lee is being held, and stages a daring rescue, much to the consternation of the family members. He leaves Lee in a motel room with a note telling him to not make a fuss about the incident if he valued his life. Lee for his part tells the media that the kidnappers were a group of overzealous fans and that he will not press charges.

A television station then invites both Choi and Lee to be on a debate show to discuss the case. A daughter of one of the victims heads there to kill Lee. During the show, a man calling himself J calls in to speak to Lee, and reveals that he knows many personal facts about Choi. J then drops a bombshell, saying that he is in fact the real killer. Choi then goes to trace the call, while Lee himself is shot when he leaves the studio, resulting in him being hospitalized again. The phone call is traced to Choi's mother's house, where J has left a video tape with footage of the 11th victim Soo-yeon being tied up and killed. It turns out that she was also Choi's girlfriend. Upon analyzing the contents of the tape, Choi calls for a press conference to tell the public that despite all this, it cannot be determined whether Lee or J is the killer. Lee continues to insist that he is the real killer, and another television debate is arranged between him, Choi and J to settle the matter once and for all. The debate draws thousands of protestors and fans, as well as Han Ji-soo, who carries a pen filled with snake venom, intent upon using it on the real killer.

J arrives and it immediately becomes apparent that he is in fact the killer, as he arranged for a camera crew to be led to the remains of his final victim, Soo-yeon. Confronted with this, Lee then makes his own revelation, admitting that not only is he not the killer, but that he also did not write the book. In fact, it was Choi who wrote the book in an attempt to flush out the real killer, using his own detailed knowledge of the crimes. Lee turns out to be Jung Hyun-sik, who worked together with Choi to fake his own death and who underwent plastic surgery to assume a new identity. Although surprised at the elaborate scheme, J claims that Choi cannot do anything to him, as the statute of limitations has long expired. Choi then plays the tape of Soo-yeon, revealing that a radio broadcast in the background proves that the footage was shot almost to that exact date in 1992, and that in fact he still has 14 minutes until the statute of limitations truly expires.

J then admits that he kept Soo-yeon with him for two years, and that when he finally decided to kill her, she claimed to be carrying his child in the vain hope that he would spare her. This enrages Choi so much that he attempts to kill J, but J makes an escape, leading to another intense chase scene. Choi finally catches up to J, and is stopped from killing him just in time. Both Lee/Jung and Han Ji-soo try to kill J as he is being led away in handcuffs, but it ends up being Choi who stabs him with the poisoned pen, thus avenging all the victims and preventing any of the family members from being convicted of the crime. In 2012, Choi is released from prison to be greeted by the media and the grateful group of victim's family members. Due to the case, the statute of limitations was extended to 25 years.

Cast 
 Jung Jae-young as Choi Hyeong-goo, a police detective
 Bae Seong-woo as detective Gwang-Soo 
 Park Si-hoo as Lee Doo-seok
 Jeong Hae-gyoon as J
 Kim Young-ae as Han Ji-soo, the victim's mother
 Choi Won-young as Jeong Tae-seok, the victim's brother
 Jo Eun-ji as Choi Kang-sook 
 Min Ji-ah as Kang Soo-yeon, Hyeong-goo's ex-girlfriend
 Lee Bong-ryun as High School girl
 Jang Gwang as a chief producer in the TV broadcasting company
 Lee Jae-goo as Director Park as a TV program director
 Kim Min-sang as Jeong Min-kwon
 Ryoo Je-seung as Jung Hyun-sik
 Cha Chung-hwa as 	Jang Jin-gak

Reception 
The film received positive review ratings on local Internet portals, and sold 1.2 million tickets in its first week of release. Despite being rated 18, it sold two million tickets by its 18th day of release. It was scheduled to be released in Japan in 2013.

The film ranked second and grossed  in its first week of release, and grossed a total of  domestically after six weeks of screening.

Remakes
The film was remade in 2017 as Memoirs of a Murderer by Yu Irie, starring Hideaki Itō and Tatsuya Fujiwara in the lead roles.

The film was remade as a South Indian Malayalam film Angels directed by Jean Markose starring Indrajith.  It was a moderate success and hit.

Awards and nominations
2013 Baeksang Arts Awards
Best Screenplay – Jung Byung-gil

2013 Grand Bell Awards
Best New Director – Jung Byung-gil
Nomination – Best New Actor – Park Si-hoo
Nomination – Best Cinematography – Kim Ki-tae
Nomination – Best Editing – Nam Na-yeong

2013 Brussels International Fantastic Film Festival
Thriller Competition Winner 

2014 Golden Cinema Festival
Silver Medal for Cinematography – Kim Ki-tae

References

External links 
  
 Confession of Murder at Showbox
 
 
 

2012 films
2012 action thriller films
2010s crime films
South Korean action thriller films
South Korean mystery thriller films
Police detective films
South Korean serial killer films
Films directed by Jeong Byeong-gil
Showbox films
2010s Korean-language films
South Korean films about revenge
South Korean films remade in other languages
2010s South Korean films